Cañari (Cañar, Kanyari) and Puruhá (Puruguay, Puruwá) are two poorly-attested extinct languages of the Marañón River basin in Ecuador that are difficult to classify. Puruhá is scarcely attested, and Cañari is known primarily from placenames. Loukotka (1968) suggests they may have been related instead to Mochica (Yunga) in a family called Chimuan, but Adelaar (2004:397) thinks it is more likely that they were Barbacoan languages. (See extinct languages of the Marañón River basin.)

Varieties
Cañari and Puruhá:
Cañari - extinct language of Cañar Province, Ecuador
Puruhá or Puruguai - extinct language once spoken in Chimborazo Province and Bolívar Province, Ecuador

"Northern Chimú" varieties listed by Loukotka (1968) are given below. All are unattested except for Huancavilca and Manabí.

Ayahuaca - extinct language spoken in the Conquest days on the Quiros River and around the city of Ayahuaca, department of Piura; now Quechuanized.
Calva - extinct language once spoken in Loja Province, Ecuador, north of the Ayahuaca tribe.
Tumbi / Tumbez - once spoken on the Tumbes River and Naranjal River, department of Tumbes, Peru.
Puná / Lapuna - once spoken on Puná Island, Ecuador.
Colonche - once spoken on the river of the same name, Guayas Province, Ecuador.
Chanduy - once spoken in the Sierra Chanduy, Guayas Province, Ecuador.
Tacame / Atacamez - once spoken on the Pacific coast of Esmeralda Province.
Chongon - once spoken on the Chongón River, Guayas province.
Coaque - extinct language once spoken on the coast of Ecuador from Galera to the mouth of the Jama River.
Manabí / Manta - extinct language of Manabí Province.
Huancavilca - extinct language spoken in Guayas Province around Guayaquil and on the Daule River and Yaguachi River.

References

Chimuan languages
Barbacoan languages
Extinct languages of South America
Proposed language families